CBS Mornings is an American morning television program which is broadcast on CBS. The program debuted on September 7, 2021, and airs live every weekday from 7:00a.m. to 9:00a.m. It is hosted by Gayle King, Tony Dokoupil, and Nate Burleson, from studios at One Astor Plaza in Times Square, the headquarters of network parent company Paramount Global.

It is the 11th distinct weekday morning news-features program format aired by CBS since 1954 and serves as a direct replacement for the second incarnation of CBS This Morning.

As part of the new format, both CBS Mornings and Saturday counterpart CBS Saturday Morning were tied more closely to the long-running weekend newsmagazine CBS Sunday Morning, including use of the latter's sun logo and "Abblasen" trumpet fanfare performed by Samuel Oatts, alongside CBS' five note jingle by Antfood, making it a partial revival of a previous CBS weekday morning show format used from 1979 to 1982.

History

Predecessors 

CBS has aired a number of news, and occasionally variety, formats in the morning hours since 1954, but has rarely been able to mount an ongoing challenge to either Today on NBC, or Good Morning America on ABC. From 1955 to 1982, these varied formats shared the morning timeslot on CBS with children's program Captain Kangaroo, which may have affected CBS' ability to gain momentum in the time period.

By many accounts, the second incarnation of CBS This Morning (CTM), which replaced The Early Show in 2012 and focused much more on hard news compared to its competition or its recent predecessors, was the most successful of these attempts in many years. CTM grew its audience in each of its first five years on the air, and came within a million viewers of Today during the November 2016 sweeps period. However, after several years of stability with co-anchors Charlie Rose, Gayle King and Norah O'Donnell, Rose was fired over multiple sexual harassment allegations in November 2017. The program's audience began to erode thereafter, with CTM also being affected by overall declines in linear television viewership which have depressed ratings for all broadcast network morning shows. Several subsequent shakeups, ultimately resulting in a co-anchor team of King, Tony Dokoupil, and Anthony Mason, did not affect the program's ratings trajectory.

Development 
CBS announced in January 2021 that Shawna Thomas had been hired as the new executive producer of CBS This Morning, filling a role that had been vacant for several months. In May 2021, CBS announced that the program would relocate from the CBS Broadcast Center to a new studio at parent company ViacomCBS' headquarters at One Astor Plaza in Times Square, previously the longtime home of MTV's Total Request Live.

In early August, the network confirmed that retired NFL player Nate Burleson would join the program as a co-anchor, replacing Mason, who would move into a new role as a culture correspondent for the network. Along with the studio move, this led to speculation that CBS was seeking to revamp the program to be patterned after Good Morning America, which is also based in Times Square and has a former NFL player, Michael Strahan, among its cast. However, executive producer Thomas denied that the program was moving towards soft news.

On August 31, CBS announced the reformatted CBS Mornings would debut with its new studio and anchor lineup on Tuesday, September 7, the day after Labor Day. CBS Mornings debuted with a refreshed version of the set constructed for CBS' 2020 election coverage, which originated from the same studio.

Format 
CBS Mornings features many of the hallmarks of its predecessor, CBS This Morning, though with some adjustments. Graphics have been updated to use the unified CBS brand identity first introduced in late 2020. The "EyeOpener" segments have been retained at the start of each hour, but the 7:00a.m. segment now serves as both a recap of the past day in news, and a teaser for segments to come on that morning's program. The central anchor table remains in place, but more casual seating arrangements including sofas and armchairs, which were rarely seen on the main CTM set, are also used at times.

The program also features additional long-form features similar to CBS Sunday Morning, particularly in its second hour. This revised format had been tested with CBS This Morning beginning earlier in 2021.

Unlike its competitors, Today and Good Morning America, CBS Mornings does not have its own meteorologist. Instead, the broadcast relies on CBS News’ partnership with The Weather Channel with Jim Cantore and Stephanie Abrams most frequently presenting the forecast from Atlanta.

On-air staff

Anchors 
 Gayle King (CBS This Morning 2012–2021, CBS Mornings 2021–present)
 Nate Burleson (CBS Mornings 2021–present) 
 Tony Dokoupil (CBS This Morning 2019–2021, CBS Mornings 2021–present)

Correspondents 
 David Begnaud – Lead National Correspondent
 Jericka Duncan – National Correspondent
 Vladimir Duthiers – "What to Watch" segment host
 Anna Werner – Consumer Investigative Correspondent

Broadcast 
In the Southern Hemisphere, in the Commonwealth of Australia, a trimmed version (70 minutes excluding commercials) of CBS Mornings currently airs on Paramount-owned Network 10, along with regional affiliate Southern Cross 10, on weekday mornings from 4:30a.m. until 6:00a.m. AEST, with the Friday edition held over to the following Monday. A national weather map of Australia is inserted during local affiliate station's cutaways for weather reports and forecasts, and commercial advertising was inserted during the cutaway for local news updates. Currently, CBS Mornings and NBC's Today (seen on the Seven Network) are the only two American morning news programs broadcast on Australian free to air television, as the Nine Network stopped showing ABC's Good Morning America in July 2018. CBS Mornings is subject to preemption in regional areas for paid and religious programming. Unlike the Seven Network, Network 10 does not show CBS Saturday Morning.

In Los Angeles, CBS Mornings airs live with the east coast at 4:00 a.m. PT on KCBS-TV as of January 5, 2023; this is followed by an hour-long simulcast of the morning show of sister station KCAL-TV, and then the tape delayed west edition of the program at 7:00 a.m.

References 

2021 American television series debuts
2020s American television news shows
CBS News
CBS original programming
English-language television shows
Television series by CBS Studios
Television shows filmed in New York City
Television morning shows in the United States